The University of Jyväskylä is a research university in Jyväskylä, Finland. It has its origins in the first Finnish-speaking Teacher Training College (the so-called Teacher Seminary), founded in 1863. Around 14,000 students are currently enrolled in the degree programs of the university.

History
Founded in 1863, the university has its origins in the first Finnish-speaking teacher training college, the so-called Teacher Seminary. Uno Cygnaeus was enthusiastic to educate the people and created a programme for organising primary school education in Finland. Cygnaeus' plan was realised in 1863, when a teacher seminary was established in Jyväskylä, on the current university campus. Based on the town's central location, the first Finnish-medium secondary schools for boys and girls were also established in Jyväskylä. The foundation of the world-famous school system was created at the University of Jyväskylä. The teacher seminary evolved into the College of Education in 1937, at which time it was given the authority to grant doctorate degrees. In the 1960s, the college started teaching and researching in the sciences and in 1967 was renamed the University of Jyväskylä.

Today the University of Jyväskylä is a nationally and internationally significant research university with expertise in education and a focus on human and natural sciences. The university is Finland's leading expert in teacher training and adult education, as well as a major exporter of education. The Faculty of Sport and Health Sciences is the only one of its kind in the country.

The university offers a wide range of study programmes for master's degree conducted in English, many of which are unique in Finland. Natural Sciences, Human Sciences, Sports and Health Sciences as well as Teacher education are the university's areas of special expertise.

Size
The university has 14,000 students in addition to its adult education students, representing nearly 40,000 students in total. Each year around 2,800 new students are admitted and generally only a seventh of applicants are accepted; this makes University of Jyväskylä one of the most popular and selective universities in Finland. Measured according to the number of master's degrees conferred, the University of Jyväskylä is ranked as the second largest university in Finland.

Organisation
The university offers undergraduate and postgraduate degrees, teacher training programmes and over 120 subject area disciplines.

The university is currently divided into six faculties:
 Faculty of Humanities and Social Sciences
 Faculty of Information Technology
 Faculty of Education and Psychology
 Faculty of Sport and Health Sciences
 Faculty of Mathematics and Science
 Jyväskylä University School of Business and Economics

Independent institutes in addition to faculties:
 Centre for Multilingual Academic Communication, Movi
 Finnish Institute for Educational Research
 Kokkola University Consortium Chydenius
 Open University
 Open Science Centre | University Library | University Museum

Excellence in Research
Centres of Excellence in Research nominated by the Academy of Finland:

2022-2029
Center of Excellence in Quark Matter, Physics
Centre of Excellence in Learning Dynamics and Intervention Research, Psychology and Educational Sciences
Centre of Excellence in Music, Mind, Body and Brain, Music
Finnish Centre of excellence in Randomness and Structures, Mathematics, coordinated by University of Helsinki

2018-2025
Research on Ageing and Care  (Coordinated by Jyväskylä)
Inverse Modelling and Imaging (Coordinated by Helsinki)
Game Culture Studies (Coordinated by Tampere)

University of Jyväskylä in global rankings

In the  global rankings, research activity at the JYU is among the top two to three percent of all universities.

Research funding

The university has succeeded well in acquiring competitive research funding - European Research Council funding as an example.

Also Academy Professorships are internationally leading-edge researchers and recognised experts in their field. They are expected to have great scientific impact in the scientific community and in society at large.

International cooperation in education

The University of Jyväskylä aims to offer its students the opportunity to study abroad and internationalisation at home. Therefore, the University of Jyväskylä is active in a variety of international programmes, such as the Lifelong Learning Programme, Nordplus, north–south-South Higher Education Exchange, FIRST and ISEP. The university has also concluded bilateral agreements on student exchange with 25 universities around the world. Altogether, the university is involved in student exchanges with more than 360 universities worldwide.

Campuses 

The faculties and departments are mainly located on three campus areas: the Main Campus area in the city centre - where the original Teacher Seminary has first started - as well as Mattilanniemi and Ylistönrinne Campuses on opposite shores of Lake Jyväsjärvi, united by a bridge, some 10 minutes walk from the Main Campus area.

Several buildings in the main campus area were designed by famous Finnish architect Alvar Aalto. Aalto received the commission to design the College of Education campus following a competition held in 1951. Aalto played on the idea of Jyväskylä's image among the town's inhabitants as it being the "Athens of the North", and layout of the campus reflects principles of Greek acropolis layouts. His scheme even included a Greek-style open-air theatre, though executed in minimal form.

Buildings in the campus area designed by Alvar Aalto:

 Teachers Training School 1951-54
 Staff housing 1951 (now offices of the Jyväskylä University Museum, Building G)
 Student's Hall of Residence 1952-54 (Building Philologica, P)
 Lozzi and Lyhty staff and student refectories (P)
 Main Building 1954–1956, Building C
 Swimming Pool 1954–1958, 1964, several alterations (called Aalto-Alvari)
 Physical Education Building 1971
 Library 1957 (now the Aalto Reading Room)

In 1969-1970 an architectural competition was arranged for the design of new university campus sites at Mattilanniemi and Ylistönrinne. The competition was won by architect Arto Sipinen, who had previously worked in Aalto's office. Sipinen also designed new buildings for the main campus, including a new main library (1974).

The three campus areas of the university - Seminaarinmäki, Mattilanniemi and Ylistönrinne - constitute a multifaceted cultural and natural environment.

The Seminaarinmäki area is of particular interest as it depicts over 100 years of history of this institute of higher education. The three distinct eras in the history of the university, first as a Teacher Training College (Seminar) 1863–1937), then as the Jyväskylä College of Education (1934-1966), to its present-day university status (1966-) are reflected in the buildings dating from the different periods.

The Teacher Seminary complex comprised five red brick buildings from 1879 to 1883 by architect Constantin Kiseleff. The old Seminar buildings and the college buildings designed by Alvar Aalto are all listed as buildings protected by the law.

Because of the need to build more facilities for the university, new buildings have been designed, many of them by architect Arto Sipinen. The Faculty of Education and Psychology has the most recently designed facility, Ruusupuisto ("Rose Park", 2015) by SARC Architects Ltd. The building got its name from a former park from the beginning of the 20th century. It was named after the many luxuriant rosebushes planted on its southern hill.

Student Union
The Student Union of the University of Jyväskylä (JYY) is the students’ very own organization. The basic task of the Student Union is to represent its members and protect their interests and rights at the university as well as in the surrounding society. All degree and exchange students enrolled in the University of Jyväskylä become members of the Student Union.

Accommodation

Kortepohja Student Village

Kortepohja Student Village is owned by the Student Union of the University of Jyväskylä. Kortepohja, located about 2.5 kilometres from the Main Campus and city centre, housing approximately 1900 students.

Central Finland Student Housing Foundation, KOAS

KOAS offers ca. 3900 apartments all around the Jyväskylä town area. The apartment buildings are conveniently located in the suburbs of Jyväskylä.

Notable people and alumni
 Alvar Aalto
 Minna Canth
 Faina Jyrkilä
 Seminaarinmäen mieslaulajat
 Sofi Oksanen
 Jutta Urpilainen
 Majaliwa Kassim Majaliwa, prime minister of Tanzania, November 2015 – present.

Former rectors
Kaarle Oksala 1934–1940
Erik Ahlman 1940–1948
Aarni Penttilä 1948–1962
Martti Takala 1963–1967
Ilppo Simo Louhivaara 1967–1977
Kalevi Heinilä 1977–1982
Martti Takala 1982–1988
Antti Tanskanen 1988–1992
Aino Sallinen 1992–2012
Matti Manninen 2012–2017
 Dr. Professor Keijo Hämäläinen from 1 August 2017

See also
 List of summer schools of nature sciences

References

External links

University of Jyväskylä - Official site
Architecture of Jyvaskyla University by Alvar Aalto on Architectuul

University of Jyväskylä
University of Jyvaskyla
Universities and colleges in Finland
Educational institutions established in 1863
Buildings and structures in Central Finland
1863 establishments in the Russian Empire